Jessie Isabel Meighen (née Cox; April 18, 1882 – September 6, 1985) was the wife of Arthur Meighen, the ninth Prime Minister of Canada.

She was born in Granby, Quebec. She married Arthur Meighen in 1904, and they had two sons and one daughter:

 Theodore Roosevelt Meighen (1905–1979), whose son Michael Meighen is a Canadian former senator, lawyer and cultural patron
 Maxwell Charles Gordon Meighen (1908–1992)
 Lillian Meighen Wright (1910–1993)

Meighen died at the age of 103 and was interred next to her husband in the St. Marys Cemetery in the town of St. Marys, Ontario.

See also
Spouse of the prime minister of Canada

References

Isabel Meighen
1880s births
1985 deaths
Canadian centenarians
People from Granby, Quebec
People from St. Mary's, Ontario
Spouses of prime ministers of Canada
Anglophone Quebec people
Women centenarians